In enzymology, a cyanuric acid amidohydrolase is an enzyme that catalyzes the chemical reaction

cyanuric acid + H2O  biuret + CO2

Thus, the two substrates of this enzyme are cyanuric acid and H2O, whereas its two products are biuret and CO2.

This enzyme belongs to the family of hydrolases, those acting on carbon-nitrogen bonds other than peptide bonds, specifically in cyclic amides.  The systematic name of this enzyme class is cyanuric acid amidohydrolase. This enzyme participates in atrazine degradation.

References

 
 

EC 3.5.2
Enzymes of unknown structure